Pavelić (alternatively spelled Pavelic, Pavelich, or Pavlich), is a Croatian family name. It is a  patronymic surname based on the male given name Pavel, Pavle or Pavao, which is a local variant of Paul. It is closely related to a number of other Slavic surnames with the same etymology such as Pavlović (Pavlovich), Pavletić (Pavletich) or Pavličić (Pavlichich). Historically they come from the area around the Croatian towns of Gospić and Senj. It ranks as the 251st most common family name in Croatia and there is around 2,000 people living in Croatia today with the surname Pavelić, some 450 of them in the capital Zagreb.

List of persons with the surname 

 Ante Pavelić (18691938), Croatian dentist and politician
 Ante Pavelić (18891959), Croatian fascist dictator and war criminal
 Bruno Pavelić (19372021), Serbian basketball player
 Ivo Pavelić (19082011), Croatian sportsman and businessman
 Katie Pavlich (born 1988), American conservative commentator, author, blogger, and podcaster
 Mark Pavelich (19582021), American ice hockey player
 Marty Pavelich (born 1927), Canadian retired ice hockey player
 Matt Pavelich (born 1934), Canadian ice hockey linesman
 Myfanwy Pavelic (19162007; née Spencer) Canadian portrait artist

References 

Croatian surnames
Patronymic surnames
Surnames from given names